The Barber of Birmingham: Foot Soldier of the Civil Rights Movement is a 2011 documentary film about James Armstrong, one of the unsung heroes of the Civil Rights Movement. A World War II veteran and an original flag bearer for the 1965 Selma to Montgomery marches, Armstrong has run a voter education program out of his barbershop in Birmingham, Alabama for 50 years. The film was co-directed and produced by Gail Dolgin and Robin Fryday. It premiered at the 2011 Sundance Film Festival, three months after Dolgin's death in October 2010 from breast cancer. It was named best short documentary at the Ashland Independent Film Festival.  The film was nominated for the Academy Award for Best Documentary (Short Subject)  at the 84th Academy Awards. It later aired on television on the PBS series POV.

See also
 Civil rights movement in popular culture

References

External links
 
 The Barber of Birmingham at The Video Project

2011 short documentary films
2011 films
American short documentary films
Documentary films about the civil rights movement
Documentary films about veterans
Films directed by Gail Dolgin
Films set in Alabama
History of Birmingham, Alabama
Kickstarter-funded documentaries
Documentary films about Alabama
2010s English-language films
2010s American films